The women's 200 metres event at the 2004 African Championships in Athletics was held in Brazzaville, Republic of the Congo on July 16–18.

Medalists

Results

Heats
Wind:Heat 1: -0.5 m/s, Heat 2: -0.3 m/s, Heat 3: +0.2 m/s, Heat 4: +0.9 m/s

Semifinals
Wind:Heat 1: +0.4 m/s, Heat 2: -1.1 m/s

Final
Wind: -1.2 m/s

References
Results

2004 African Championships in Athletics
200 metres at the African Championships in Athletics
2004 in women's athletics